Mezhdurechensky District is an administrative district (raion), one of the nineteen in Kemerovo Oblast, Russia. It is located in the southeast of the oblast. Its administrative center is the city of Mezhdurechensk (which is not administratively a part of the district). Population:  2,658 (2002 Census).

Administrative and municipal status
Within the framework of administrative divisions, Mezhdurechensky District is one of the nineteen in the oblast. The city of Mezhdurechensk serves as its administrative center, despite being incorporated separately as a town under oblast jurisdiction—an administrative unit with the status equal to that of the districts.

As a municipal division, the territory of the administrative district and the territory of Mezhdurechensk City Under Oblast Jurisdiction are incorporated together as Mezhdurechensky Urban Okrug.

References

Notes

Sources

Districts of Kemerovo Oblast
